Bhuvana Sundari Katha is a 1967 Indian Telugu-language swashbuckler film directed by C. Pullaiah. It stars N. T. Rama Rao and Krishna Kumari, with music composed by Ghantasala.

Plot 
The film is a tale of two kingdoms Vichitrapuram & Kanchanapuram, ruled by Chitrasena (Mukkamala), and Hiranyavarma (Mikkilineni) respectively. Chitrasena is an enthusiast in fancy items in lieu he occurs half of the kingdom as an accolade. Besides, Hiranyavarma establishes a chair called Bhuvaneshwari Peetam, that any arraigned enters into it, is garlanded if innocent or preyed to the tiger if malefactor. Once Rajagaru's (Dhulipala) son Devadatta (Satyanarayana) tries to molest Princess Bhuvana Sundari (Krishna Kumari), who is accused and the tiger preys him. Here, vicious Rajaguru intrigues, makes his son escape. At this point, Devadatta starts his journey, en route he meets a stranger Bujjaiah (Allu Ramalingaiah), and both of them advance further when they are startled to witness a flying palanquin. Unfortunately, its framer is slaughtered by a demon. Devadatta & Bujjaiah hand over the palanquin and exhibits to Chitrasena. At that point, Prince Chandrasena (N. T. Rama Rao) takes a trail that moves in the wrong direction and lands at Bhuvana Sundari's palace where they fall in love. Currently, Chandrasena is captured and charged regardless, Chandrasena flees away with Bhuvana Sundari. After reaching his kingdom, Devadatta spots Bhuvana Sundari, accordingly, he seizes her along with the palanquin and reaches Kanchipuram. Anyhow, Bhuvana Sundari gets away and reaches her parents where no one trusts her, in addition, sycophantic Rajaguru falsifies her as a lunatic.

Parallelly, Chandrasena proceeds towards Kanchipuram, in between, he relieves a curse of a demon, when he is blessed with the boon Parakaya Pravesha (leaving one's own soul and entering others). After reaching Kanchipuram, he takes shelter at laundry man Tippayya's (Uday Kumar) house. After different approaches, Chandrasena fails to enter the palace. So, he trains Tippayya for the trick, exchanges their bodies, and brings out Bhuvana Sundari. At present, hoodwinker Tippayya refuses to take his body. So, helpless, Chandrasena moves to his kingdom. Meanwhile, Rajagaru learns the reality, and counterfeits Tippa (in Chandrasena) as a prince before Chitrasena via Devadatta. Further, Chandrasena (in Tippa) is taken over and Chitrasena forcibly announces the wedding of Chandrasena (in Tippa) & Bhuvana Sundari. Then Rajaguru disguises himself as an astrologer and states Bhuvana Sundari's horoscope as unholy. Believing it, Chitrasena edicts to drop her into the river keeping in a box. Fortunately, she is rescued by some tribal and they put a wild bear in the box. Meanwhile, Chandrasena (in Tippa) breaks free, over and above Tippa (in Chandrasena), Rajaguru & Devadatta moves for Bhuvana Sundari. Right now, the wild bear attacks when Chandrasena (in Tippa) kills it. But Rajaguru backstabs him, hence, he enters into the bear, does Rajaguru to the death, also threatens Tippa (in Chandrasena), and gets back his body. At the same time, Devadatta abducts Bhuvana Sundari in the flying palanquin, Chandrasena protects her and eliminates Devadatta. Finally, the movie ends with the marriage of Chandrasena & Bhuvana Sundari.

Cast 
N. T. Rama Rao as Chandra Senudu
Krishna Kumari as Bhuvana Sundari
Satyanarayana as Devadatta
Mikkilineni as Hiranyavarma
Dhulipala as Rajagaru
Udaya Kumar as Tippayya
Mukkamala as Chitrasenudu
Allu Ramalingaiah as Bujjaiah
Vanisri as Ellamma
Chaya Devi as Hiranyavarma's wife

Soundtrack 
Music composed by Ghantasala.

References

External links 
 

1960s Telugu-language films
Films directed by C. Pullayya
Films scored by Ghantasala (musician)
Indian swashbuckler films